Following is a list of senators of Doubs, people who have represented the department of Doubs in the Senate of France.

Third Republic

Senators for Doubs under the French Third Republic were:

 Antoine Monnot-Arbilleur (1876)
 Werner de Mérode (1876-1885)
 Gustave Oudet (1876-1897)
 Félix Gaudy(1885-1894)
 Jean Bernard (1889-1908)
 Félix Gaudy (1894-1895)
 Alfred Nicolas Rambaud (1895-1903)
 Albin Saillard (1897-1912)
 Alexandre Grosjean (1908-1921)
 Charles Borne (1903-1913)
 Maurice Ordinaire (1913-1934)
 Joseph Butterlin (1912-1921)
 René de Moustier (1921-1929)
 Gaston Japy (1921-1936)
 Jean Fabry (1936-1940)
 Maurice Baufle (1934-1940)
 René de Moustier (1929-1935) 
 Georges Pernot (1935-1940)

Fourth Republic

Senators for Doubs under the French Fourth Republic were:

Fifth Republic 
Senators for Doubs under the French Fifth Republic:

References

Sources

 
Lists of members of the Senate (France) by department